The 2020 Pensacola 200 presented by Inspectra Thermal Solutions was the sixth and final stock car race of the 2020 ARCA Menards Series East season and the seventh iteration of the event. The race was held on Sunday, October 11, 2020, in Pensacola, Florida, at Five Flags Speedway, a  paved oval-shaped racetrack. The race took the scheduled 200 laps to complete. At race's end, Sam Mayer of GMS Racing would pass a dominating Grant Enfinger and hold off the field to win the 2020 ARCA Menards Series East championship in dominating fashion. The win was Mayer's ninth career win in the ARCA Menards Series East and his fifth and final win of the season. To fill out the podium, Corey Heim of Venturini Motorsports and Ty Gibbs of Joe Gibbs Racing would finish second and third, respectively.

Background 
Five Flags Speedway is a paved half mile (0.8 km) auto racing oval in Pensacola, Florida, United States. It opened in 1953 and is located on Pine Forest Road. It is christened after the nickname of Pensacola—"City of Five Flags."

It runs several local classes during the regular racing season (March – October). These classes include Super Late Models, Pro Late Models, Pro Trucks, Outlaw Stocks, Sportsman, and Pure Stocks. The races are usual held on Friday nights bi-weekly. The track has also hosted many regional touring series.

Entry list 

*Withdrew.

*Originally, Oakley would drive the #22, and Griffith would drive the #2. However, Oakley would withdraw, and Chad Bryant Racing would decide to switch back to their usual #22.

Qualifying 
Qualifying was held on Sunday, October 11. Each driver would have 40 minutes to set a fastest time; the fastest of their laps would count as their official qualifying lap.

Full qualifying results

Race results

References 

2020 ARCA Menards Series East
October 2020 sports events in the United States
2020 in sports in Florida